Niperotidine is a histamine antagonist selective for the H2 subtype. It was studied as a treatment for excessive gastric acidity, but withdrawn after human trials showed liver damage.

References

Abandoned drugs
Dimethylamino compounds
Benzodioxoles
Furans
H2 receptor antagonists
Hepatotoxins
Nitroethenes
Thioethers